Tangents is a greatest hits collection from Canadian band The Tea Party, released in 2000 (see 2000 in music).

Tangents includes singles from Splendor Solis (1993), The Edges of Twilight (1995), Transmission (1997) and Triptych (1999), together with the single "Walking Wounded", B-sides recorded during the Triptych sessions and a cover of The Rolling Stones' "Paint It, Black". The album reached platinum status within a few months of its release.

The DVD compilation Illuminations was released in 2001 to complement Tangents.

Stuart Chatwood (Creative Director), Antoine Moonen (Graphic Artist), James St. Laurent/Margaret Malandruccolo/Nick Sarros (Photographers) won the 2001 Juno Award for "Best Artwork".

Tangents debuted at #10 on the Canadian Albums Chart, selling 14,780 copies in its first week.

Track listing 
 "Walking Wounded" – 4:37
 "Temptation" (Transmission) – 3:25
 "The Messenger" (Daniel Lanois cover) (Triptych) – 3:31
 "Psychopomp" (Transmission) – 5:15
 "Sister Awake" (The Edges of Twilight) – 5:43
 "The Bazaar" (The Edges of Twilight) – 3:42
 "Save Me" (remix) (Splendor Solis) – 6:36
 "Fire in the Head" (The Edges of Twilight) – 5:06
 "Release" (Transmission) – 4:04
 "Heaven Coming Down" (Triptych) – 4:01
 "The River" (remix) – 5:43 (Splendor Solis)
 "Babylon" (Transmission) – 2:49
 "Waiting on a Sign" – 4:21
 "Lifeline" – 4:37
 "Paint It Black" (The Rolling Stones cover)  – 3:34

Charts

Weekly charts

Year-end charts

Certifications

References

External links
Lyrics

 The Tea Party LIVE - Photography James St Laurent
 The Tea Party • Triptych Sessions - Photography James St Laurent

The Tea Party albums
Albums produced by Ed Stasium
2000 compilation albums